A mobile billboard, also known as a "digital billboard truck", is a device used for advertising on the sides of a truck or trailer that is typically mobile. Mobile billboards are a form of transit media; static billboards, and mall/airport advertising fall into this same category. Using a mobile billboard for advertising is an advertising niche called mobile outdoor advertising.

Description
Most mobile billboards are dedicated, customized LED trucks with large bodies for displaying advertisements. Some of these dedicated units offer features such as external sound systems, illumination, LED panels and hot/cold boxes for product sampling, although they are illegal in many cities. Digital mobile billboard trucks have become popular, but the most capable in terms of gaining exposure are static mobile billboards. Static mobile billboards do not share advertising space. 

Some of the most cost effective mobile billboards are installed wraps on trucks and trailers that are in service delivering goods serving as multi-purpose vehicles achieving "green status" or "truck side advertising".  

Box-type trucks with panels enclosing the cargo space can be turned into a mobile 3D display case.  Many companies use these trucks for parades, product launches, furniture displays, and general rapid-awareness creation. Almost anything can be placed inside of the boxes for display.

For micromarketing campaigns, small-engine scooters and human walking billboards are used for experiential marketing and direct to consumer marketing.  This form has become a very effective intercity advertising method for Chicago, Illinois.

Installation
Advertisements on standard billboard trucks are installed by applying large vinyl sheets as decals, or by fastening a large sheet of vinyl to the sides of the truck or trailer using specialized aluminum frames.
 
With the new LED mobile digital billboard trucks require large expensive screens to be installed on trucks.

Effectiveness
Industry analysts, researchers and trade representatives have researched the effectiveness of mobile billboards. Outdoor Advertising Magazine said that outdoor mobile media billboards have a 97% recall rate, and 96% of survey respondents thought mobile advertising is more effective than traditional outdoor advertising. 3M and the American Trucking Association noted 91% of the target noticed the text and graphics on truck advertising, and the Traffic Audit Bureau noted that on local routes monthly impressions ranged from one to four million hits. Product Acceptance and Research said 94% of respondents recalled seeing the Mobile Billboard, with 80% recalling the specific advertisement; the billboards resulted in a sales increase of 107%.

Utilisation
Mobile Billboards are generally used due to the perceived benefits such as being able to deliver a message in places where traditional billboards are unavailable. They also offer a median that does not get cluttered by other advertisements and are not generally seen near competitors. Many also find it advantageous that the message is less likely to be tuned out by drivers than other advertising medians.

Legality
Some municipalities have strict laws against mobile advertisements. According to London Hackney Carriage Act 1853 and Section 9 of the Metropolitan Streets Act 1867 it is not lawful for any person to carry any picture, placard, notice, or advertisement, on any carriage or on horseback or on foot in London except those which are approved of by the Commissioner of Police of the Metropolis or the Commissioner of the City of London Police. Adbikes and billboard bicycles can often be used as a substitute.  Smaller cities code compliance often use a complaint driven model wherein the smaller lighter trucks seem to have fewer complaints and are often allowed.    These mobile billboard trucks have been welcomed more by municipalities over the larger trucks.

In the US, mobile advertising falls under the First Amendment to the United States Constitution. The US Supreme Court has issued rulings that protect "commercial speech" as well. Hence, it is difficult for any jurisdiction to limit such advertising beyond public safety issues. Since most complaints regarding mobile advertising relate to oversized trucks with loudspeakers, the bigger companies are more likely to have lawyers on retainer who can remind the authorities of US Constitutional protection of free speech and commerce. However, content-neutral regulations of speech with a legitimate government interest are subject to a more deferential standard of review. Ordinances banning mobile billboards on traffic and public safety grounds, regardless of message and without singling out commercial advertisement, have been largely upheld as legitimately and reasonably regulating the form, and not content, of speech.

In Norway, the use of wrap advertising on buses was prohibited by the road authorities. The reason behind the ban was that in an emergency, the windows might need to serve as an emergency exit and that the advertising would make the window harder to break with the emergency hammer. Gaia Trafikk argued against the ban, pointing out that their tests showed that the thin wrap had no impact on the breakability of the window, but did remove the advertising which covered the windows.

Other forms
There are many other forms of outdoor mobile advertising, which are considered mobile billboards by some advertising professionals. 

One such form is called wrap advertising, which differs from mobile billboards because wrap advertisements typically envelop an entire vehicle, typically a car or small truck, while mobile billboards are large flat surfaces like traditional billboards.  

Other mobile advertising formats include bicycles, airplane banner towing, blimps, and mobile billboards on water, towed by boats.

See also

Bus advertising
Fleet media
Live billboards
Out-of-home advertising
Truckside advertisement

References

Advertising by medium
Advertising tools
Billboards
Public transport